The Rock River is a  stream in Baraga County on the Upper Peninsula of Michigan in the United States. It rises at the outlet of Worm Lake, east of Covington, and flows northwest. It eventually empties into the Sturgeon River which continues west, then north to Portage Lake and Lake Superior. The Rock River descends  over its  course, for an average rate of 58 feet per mile.

See also
List of rivers of Michigan

References

Michigan  Streamflow Data from the USGS

Rivers of Michigan
Rivers of Baraga County, Michigan
Tributaries of Lake Superior